Mount O'Connell is a small national park in Queensland, Australia, 605 km northwest of Brisbane.  The park is located in the Shoalwater drainage sub-basin within the Brigalow Belt bioregion.  It straddles the slopes of Mount O'Connell.

The Atalaya multiflora tree has been identified in the park.

See also

 Protected areas of Queensland

References

National parks of Central Queensland
Protected areas established in 1989